Joseph Ernest "Ernie" Brooks (20 November 1892 – 1975) was an English professional footballer who played as a winger.

References

1892 births
1975 deaths
People from Heanor
Footballers from Derbyshire
English footballers
Association football wingers
Langley Heanor F.C. players
Grimsby Town F.C. players
Shirebrook Miners Welfare F.C. players
Leicester City F.C. players
Kettering Town F.C. players
English Football League players